Kita is a Japanese and Polish surname. As a Japanese surname it might be written various ways in kanji (e.g.  meaning "north";  meaning "field of trees";  meaning "many happinesses"). Notable people with the surname include:

 , Japanese baseball outfielder
 Candace Kita (born 1967), American actress
 , Japanese long-distance runner
 , Japanese philosopher
 , Japanese football goalkeeper
 , Japanese vocalist and guitarist
 , Japanese novelist
 Przemysław Kita (born 1993), Polish football striker
 Regina Wasilewska-Kita (born 1951), Polish politician
 , Japanese ryūkōka singer 
 , lieutenant general in the Imperial Japanese Army
 , Japanese gymnast
 , Japanese basketball coach
 , Japanese furniture designer 
 , Japanese football defender
 Waldemar Kita (born 1953), Polish businessman

References

See also
 

Japanese-language surnames
Polish-language surnames